Just Group plc, formerly JRP Group plc and, before that, Just Retirement Group plc, is a British company specialising  in retirement products and services headquartered in Reigate, Surrey. It is listed on the London Stock Exchange and is a constituent of the FTSE 250 Index.

History

The company, which was established as Just Retirement in 2004, was listed on the Alternative Investment Market until it was bought out by Permira in 2009. It launched a fixed-term product that links with enhanced annuity rates in 2011 and then set up a pensions de-risking arm in 2012. It went on to join the long term care market and to offer individually underwritten annuities in 2013. The company was the subject of an initial public offering in November 2013. In April 2016 the company merged with Partnership Assurance and was renamed JRP Group. In May 2017 the company changed its name to Just Group plc.

Operations
The company provides annuities to retirees with serious health conditions such as heart disease and to heavy smokers. The products pay out a higher income than the usual products.

Sponsorship
The company has been the sponsor For the World Bowls Events for 2014, 2015 and 2016. Under the 'Just' brand the company also sponsored the event for 2017 and 2018.

Prudential Regulation Authority proposals
The firm’s share price fell after it announced in its business update on 24 July 2018 that proposals by the Prudential Regulation Authority on the valuation of equity release mortgages could, if implemented, result in a reduction in the firm's regulatory capital position.

Relationship with Age UK
Just Group came under fire after claims that Age UK was sending users through its commercial arm (Age Co) to an equity release advice service provided by Hub Financial, a company wholly owned by Just. While customers were told that Hub compared deals from a panel of five providers, its advice process was structured so that in most cases a customer would be offered a deal by just one panel member, namely Just.

References

External links
Official site

Financial services companies established in 2004
Companies based in Surrey
Companies listed on the London Stock Exchange